Mirko Topić (born 5 February 2001) is a Serbian footballer playing for Vojvodina.

Club career

Vojvodina
On 12 May 2019, Topić made his first team debut, replacing Nemanja Milojević in 64th minute, in 2:1 home loss to Partizan.

International career
Topić made his debut for Serbia national football team on 25 January 2023 in a friendly match against USA. Serbia won the game 2 – 1, with Topić being a starter.

Career statistics

Club

International

Honours
Vojvodina
Serbian Cup: 2019–20

References

External links
 
 

2001 births
Living people
Footballers from Novi Sad
Association football midfielders
Serbian footballers
Serbia youth international footballers
FK Vojvodina players
Serbian SuperLiga players
Serbia under-21 international footballers
Serbia international footballers